William Walsh (4 December 1923 – 28 July 2014), known as Bill or Billy Walsh, was an English footballer who made 145 appearances in the Football League playing as a centre half for Sunderland, Northampton Town and Darlington.

Walsh began his career in non-league football with Horden Colliery Welfare, and made his competitive debut for Sunderland on 11 September 1946 against Charlton Athletic in a 5–0 defeat at The Valley. Overall, he went on to make 98 First Division appearances and scored one goal for the club in a career spanning from 1946 to 1953. He spent one season each with Northampton Town and Darlington, before emigrating to Australia in 1956, where he played for Hakoah.

Walsh was born in Horden, County Durham, and died in Gold Coast, Queensland, Australia.

References

1923 births
2014 deaths
People from Horden
Footballers from County Durham
English footballers
Association football defenders
Darlington Town F.C. players
Sunderland A.F.C. players
Northampton Town F.C. players
Darlington F.C. players
Hakoah Sydney City East FC players
English Football League players
English expatriate footballers
English expatriate sportspeople in Australia
Expatriate soccer players in Australia